The Last Coyote is the fourth novel by American crime author Michael Connelly, featuring the Los Angeles detective Hieronymus "Harry" Bosch.  It was first published in 1995 and the novel won the 1996 Dilys Award given by the Independent Mystery Booksellers Association.

Explanation of the novel's title
Los Angeles detective Harry Bosch has seen and then dreamed about a lone coyote near his home in the hills near Los Angeles and discusses it during a departmental required therapy session.  The psychologist interprets it that Bosch believes that there are not many policeman like himself left and that he feels the same threat to his existence as the coyote.

Plot summary

Bosch is involved in an incident at work and has been put on involuntary stress leave. He must go through therapy sessions to be able to return to work. This involves talking about the incident and himself with Carmen Hinojos, a police psychologist. Three months ago, Bosch broke up with his girlfriend, Sylvia Moore. Carmen asks Harry to verbalize his mission in life. Harry decides that his mission is to investigate his mother's murder. She had been a prostitute and was strangled when Harry was twelve. He gets the murder book from the police archives and reviews the case. He first goes to visit Meredith Roman, another prostitute who was his mother's best friend at the time.  The one real piece of information that Bosch gets from her is something that she did not tell the police: his mother was going to meet Arno Conklin at Hancock Park on the night of the murder.  Bosch, with the help of the new cop beat/LA Times reporter, investigates Fox, Conklin, and Conklin's close associate Mittel.  He discovers that Fox was killed in a hit and run while distributing campaign literature for Conklin. Conklin had been running for District Attorney. He also learns from an old cop friend that Mittel is now a very successful lawyer and campaign fund raiser.  He is currently helping Robert Shepard, a computer tycoon, run for the Senate.  On a whim, Harry drives to Mittel's house and ends up attending a fund-raising party.   He meets Mittel and, using the name of his boss Pounds whom he cannot stand, asks a waitress at the party to deliver an envelope to Mittel.  In the envelope, Harry puts a copy of a newspaper article about Fox's death and circles the names Conklin, Mittel, and Fox.  He writes under the article, "What prior work experience got Johnny his job?"  Harry checks with the city offices and finds out that only one of the original investigating officers is still alive and that his retirement checks are mailed to a post office box in Florida.  So he takes a plane to Florida to speak with the retired detective, Jake McKittrick.  He learns from him that at the beginning of the investigation, his senior partner, Eno, was called into the Assistant DA's office and told that Fox was not involved with the murder and he should not be investigated by the department.  The only way they could interview him was in Conklin's office in the presence of Conklin and Mittel.  After that interview, the investigation went nowhere and was left as an unsolved case.

In order to gain entrance to the gated community where McKittrick lives, Bosch pretends he is interested in a house for sale in the community and tours the house briefly.  He goes back to the house after leaving McKittrick and eventually has a romantic encounter with the woman who owns the house, Jasmine Corian.  He spends an extra day in Florida with Jasmine, and they reveal many personal secrets to each other in bed.  On his way back to Los Angeles, he stops in Las Vegas to visit the widow of the other detective, Eno.  He intimidates the woman posing as the widow's sister, who is taking care of the ninety-year-old invalid, into letting him take some of Eno's old files.  From the files, he discovers that Eno had been receiving $1000 a week through a dummy corporation since one year after his mother's murder.  He learns that this corporation's officers were Eno, Gordon Mittel, and Arno Conklin.  When he returns to Los Angeles, there are four Los Angeles Police Department cops waiting for him inside his home.  While he was in Florida, his boss, Harvey Pounds was found dead in the trunk of his car, tortured.  Bosch is brought to the Parker Center for questioning.  A senior policeman with Internal Affairs Department believes that Harry had Pounds killed and set up an alibi for himself in Florida.  He calls Harry a killer and likewise Jasmine.  Harry now understands the hints that Jasmine gave her about her having suffered and eventually getting away from domestic violence but is annoyed that she was not open with him about it.  And Harry realizes that when he used Pounds' name when trying to scare Mittel at the Shepard fund-raiser, it led to his death.  Harry learns from LA Times reporter Keisha Russell that the writer of the article on Fox was Monte Kim. Russell gives Bosch his address obtained from the phone book.  Bosch visits Kim and learns that he wrote the article on Fox's death, ignoring the illegal activities in his past in order to obtain a job with Conklin.  Kim had photos of Conklin and Fox with two women (Meredith Roman and Bosch's mother) and used them to blackmail Conklin to obtain the job.

Bosch, believing that he finally has enough information to confront Conklin, visits him in his nursing home and discovers that Conklin was actually in love with Bosch's mother.  On the day that she was murdered, they decided to go to Las Vegas and get married.  Conklin had called Mittel to ask him to go with them to be his best man.  Mittel declined and told him that marrying her would ruin his career. Conklin believes that Mittel murdered Bosch's mother.  After leaving Conklin, Bosch is hit with a tire iron when trying to get in his car and awakes at Mittel's house with his head bleeding, locked in a game room.  Before Mittel's enforcer can arrive, Bosch pockets a billiard ball that he hopes to use as a weapon.  Mittel tells Bosch that Conklin has conveniently jumped out of the window of his room right after Bosch left - obviously not a suicide since Conklin's both legs were amputated.  So the last loose end for him to clean up is Bosch.  After Bosch tells him that he left his briefcase with his evidence in Conklin's room, Mittel nods to Jonathan to finish off Bosch.  But Bosch makes Jonathan miss, hits him with the billiard ball, and eventually knocks him out.  Mittel runs off, and Bosch follows. Mittel attempts to ambush Bosch and in the struggle, Mittel falls off a cliff and dies.  Bosch returns to the house but cannot locate Jonathan. The police arrive, and Bosch next wakes up in the emergency room. Bosch realizes that he can prove that Mittel killed his mother by checking his fingerprints against the print found on the belt that killed his mother.  He obtains the prints from the medical examiner's office but they do not match.  Bosch has gone through all of this and still has not found his mother's killer.

He returns to talk to Hinojos. During this meeting, she gives Bosch her opinion on the photos from his mother's crime scene.  She noticed that his mother was wearing all gold jewelry and the belt that was used to kill her was silver, which is a combination which a woman would not normally wear.  Bosch's mother might not have been wearing the belt. The killer may have been wearing the belt and used it to kill his mother.  Bosch believes he finally knows who killed his mother and returns to Meredith Roman's house, only to find that several days before she committed suicide.  She left Bosch a note trying to explain her actions.  He calls 911 and is about to leave when Jonathan confronts him with a gun. He had been waiting for him, letting him find Meredith and the letter.  Since Jonathan believes he is going to kill Bosch and escape, he tells him the truth: that in actuality, he is Johnny Fox.  His death was faked, and he remained with Mittel as his bodyguard. It was Fox who had killed Pounds and Conklin.  The police finally arrive, and Fox is shot while trying to escape.  Bosch visits Jasmine in Florida.

Characters in The Last Coyote
 Carmen Hinojos — Psychologist for the Los Angeles Police Department
 Meredith Roman — Prostitute friend of Bosch's mother
 Keisha Russell — Reporter for the Los Angeles Times
 Lieutenant Harvey "Ninety-Eight" Pounds — Bosch's supervisor
 Jerry Edgar — Bosch's partner
 Irvin Irving — Assistant Chief of the Los Angeles Police Department
 Arno Conklin — Former District Attorney
 Gordon Mittel — Lawyer
 Jake McKittrick — detective who investigated the murder of Bosch's mother.
 Jasmine Corian — A painter with whom Harry becomes romantically involved during a trip to Florida.
 Monte Kim — former Los Angeles Times reporter

Reception
The Library Journal said that The Last Coyote had "prose that cuts to the quick, a masterfully interwoven plot and gripping suspense".

Awards and nominations
The Last Coyote won the 1996 Dilys Award given by the Independent Mystery Booksellers Association

The Last Coyote was a nominee for the 1996 Anthony Award, the 1996 Macavity Award and the 1996 Hammett Prize.

Notes

Harry Bosch series
1995 American novels
Novels set in Los Angeles
Novels set in Florida
Dilys Award-winning works
Little, Brown and Company books